The Gap Sealer is an album by saxophonist Jimmy Heath featuring performances recorded in 1972 and originally released on the Cobblestone label but rereleased as Jimmy on the Muse label.

Reception

Ron Wynn of Allmusic called the album "Some of Heath's finest, most aggressive playing. He is a standout on soprano, flute, and tenor".

Track listing
All compositions by Jimmy Heath except as indicated
 "Heritage Hum"  - 7:48   
 "Invitation" (Bronislau Kaper, Paul Francis Webster) - 5:46
 "A Sound for Sore Ears" - 7:20   
 "Gap Sealer"  - 7:28   
 "Angel Man"  - 7:20   
 "Alkebu-Lan (Land of the Blacks)" - 7:34

Personnel
Jimmy Heath - tenor saxophone, soprano saxophone, flute
Kenny Barron - piano, electric piano
Bob Cranshaw  - electric bass
Albert Heath - drums
Mtume - congas, percussion

References

Muse Records albums
Cobblestone Records albums
Jimmy Heath albums
1973 albums
Albums produced by Don Schlitten